Falkenberg Municipality (Falkenbergs kommun) is a municipality in Halland County on the Swedish west coast. The town Falkenberg is the municipal seat.

The municipality was created in 1971 when the City of Falkenberg was amalgamated with six rural municipalities (themselves formed by the 1952 local government reform) and part of a seventh. There are 24 original entities within the area.

Today, Falkenberg holds a strong position in the food and beverage industry with companies such as Arla Foods, Carlsberg and SIA Glass having plants in the city. In the inland Gekås, a major department store, draws visitors from all over the country. Falkenberg is also a tourist city, mainly for its many beaches.

Economy
The main income for the Municipality is tourism from around Sweden, Germany, Denmark, Holland and Norway.  The food industry is important. Here has Carlsberg Brewery a plant with 570 employees and Arla Foods who makes cheese has a factory with 400 employees.  Other important workplaces is the Gekås shoppingcentre in Ullared which has more than 1,100 employees.  The centre is a "Mecka" for low-price shoppers and the company earns more than 
2 700 000 000 (340 500 000 US Dollars) kronor each year. The shoppingcentre in Wal-Mart style (almost without food)company has 3,800,000 visitors each year which makes it Sweden's most visited place.

Politics
The Right Party was the major party until 1931, when the Social Democratic Party gained that position. The municipality has, however, been a stronghold for the centre-right, whose parties have led the municipality thereafter, except for the period between 1994-1998 and 2018-. The current mayor is Per Svensson (Socialdemokratic Party) and the deputy mayor is Annelie Andelén (Centre).

Localities
There are 17 urban areas (also called a tätort, or locality) in Falkenberg Municipality.

In the table the localities are listed according to the size of the population as of 31 December 2005. The municipal seat is in bold characters.

International relations

Twin towns — Sister cities
The municipality is twinned with:

  Borgarfjörður, Iceland
  Gniezno, Poland
  Leirvík, Faroe Islands
  Pieksämäki, Finland
  Ullensaker, Norway

Notable natives 
Pär Zetterberg, football player
Niclas Alexandersson, football player
Magnus Svensson, football player
Stellan Bengtsson, former world champion, table tennis
Per-Gunnar Andersson, race driver
Lizzy DeVine, former lead singer of Vains Of Jenna
J.P White, former bassist of Vains Of Jenna
Nicki Kin, former guitarist of Vains Of Jenna
Jacki Stone, former drummer Vains Of Jenna

See also
 Hallands Nyheter
 Sport
Falkenbergs FF, association football
Falkenbergs VBK, volleyball
Falkenbergs BTK, table tennis
Falkenbergs Motorbana (motorsport racetrack)

References
Statistics Sweden

External links

Falkenberg Municipality - Official site
Falkenberg racetrack

 
Municipalities of Halland County